Aioi Station is the name of four train stations in Japan:

 Aioi Station (Gifu) (相生駅) in Gifu Prefecture
 Aioi Station (Gunma) (相老駅) in Gunma Prefecture
 Aioi Station (Hyogo) (相生駅) in Hyogo Prefecture
 Sanuki-Aioi Station (讃岐相生駅) in Kagawa Prefecture